Great Asian Railway Journeys is a 20-part BBC travel and history documentary series produced by Boundless and presented by Michael Portillo, a former Conservative MP and Minister of State for Transport. Following the format of the highly successful Great British Railway Journeys and related series with Portillo as presenter, each episode features a railway journey in south-east Asia using Bradshaw's Through Routes to the Chief Cities, and Bathing, and Health Resorts of the World (1913) as a historical reference, in order to consider how the places visited have changed over the preceding century.

During the course of the series, Portillo travels a total distance of 2,500 miles and passes through six countries, beginning with Hong Kong then moving on to Thailand, Vietnam, Indonesia and Malaysia before reaching his final destination of Singapore. One of the main themes he explores is colonial history, examining the legacy of the British, French, Dutch and Portuguese empires, and how the countries involved gained their independence. Filming for the series was carried out in two stages and took 7–8 weeks to complete.

Broadcast

The programme was first broadcast as 20 30-minute episodes on consecutive weekday evenings on BBC Two, beginning on 27 January 2020. It was re-broadcast weekly as ten 60-minute episodes starting 4 April 2020.

Episodes

Notes

References

External links

See also

 Colonialism
 Imperialism
 Rail Transport in Hong Kong
 Rail Transport in Indonesia
 Rail Transport in Malaysia
 Rail Transport in Singapore
 Rail Transport in Thailand
 Rail Transport in Vietnam

BBC television documentaries
BBC travel television series
Documentary television series about railway transport
Television series by Fremantle (company)
Television shows set in Hong Kong
Television shows set in Thailand
Television shows set in Vietnam
2020 British television series debuts
2020 British television series endings
2020s British documentary television series
2020s British travel television series
English-language television shows